Nanhai County was a former county in Guangdong Province, China, named after the South China Sea.

Its former area now makes up Nanhai District in Foshan and Liwan District in Guangzhou.

See also

References

Former counties of China
Liwan District
Nanhai District
History of Guangdong